Frisilia moriutii is a moth in the family Lecithoceridae. It was described by Kyu-Tek Park in 2005. It is found in Thailand.

The wingspan is 17–18 mm. The forewing pattern is similar to that of Frisilia forficatella, but moriutii is larger.

References

Moths described in 2005
Frisilia